Emmanuel "Masanja Mkandamizaji" Mgaya is a Tanzanian comedian who co-hosts the comedy TV show  Orijino Komedi on TBC1 Tanzania with five other Tanzanian comedians (Joti, Mpoki, Wakuvanga, MC Reagan, and Vengu).  Emmanuel was born in Ubaruku village, but has since moved to Dar es Salaam. He has worked in the comedy industry since 2005 and is now considered a household name in Tanzania.

Emmanuel is estimated to be worth more than $3m with investments in entertainment, fast food restaurants and commercial agriculture.

He is one of the top 10 most influential Tanzanians on social media., and one of the first Tanzanians to get a million followers on Instagram.

Apart from being a performing artist, Emmanuel is also a pastor and owns a fast growing church known as "Mito ya Baraka", Swahili for Rivers of Blessings in Tanzania's capital, Dar es Salaam. Emmanuel has performed in 4 continents: his  native Africa, North America, Asia, and Europe. In 2015 Emmanuel Mgaya 

participated in election preliminaries for Ludewa Province MP within CCM but subsequently he was not successful

References

External links

Living people
1985 births
Tanzanian television presenters